Adiantum lianxianense is a species of maidenhair fern native to China. While the IUCN Red List describes it as extinct, due to habitat loss, it may still survive, as it has frequently been confused with other members of the genus.

Taxonomy
The species was first described as distinct by Ren-Chang Ching and You-Xing Lin in 1980. The type specimen was collected by Rev. Benjamin Couch Henry in Lianzhou (Lianxian) in 1881, but was initially determined to be Adiantum gravesii.

A 2012 paper purporting to show that A. lianxianense was genetically nested within A. gravesii led the authors to suggest that, due to their genetic and morphological similarity, A. lianxianense should not be treated as a distinct species from A. gravesii. However, this specimen (J.-M. Lu 441, from Guangdong) was subsequently re-identified as A. mariesii.

Distribution and habitat
Its natural habitat is subtropical or tropical moist lowland forest.

Conservation
The IUCN Red List assessment for A. lianxianense in 2004 declared it to be known only from Guangdong and extinct due to habitat loss. However, the species was reported to have been found in Guanxi in 2011, while a 2012 review of narrowly distributed pteridophyte flora in Asia described its range as extending through Guangdong, Guizhou, and Hunan, and did not describe it as extinct.

Notes and references

References

Works cited

lianxianense
Endemic flora of China
Extinct flora of Asia
Ferns of Asia
Flora of Guangdong
Plant extinctions since 1500
Taxonomy articles created by Polbot
Plants described in 1980
Taxa named by Ren-Chang Ching